Joseph Sumner (born 23 November 1976) is an English singer-songwriter and bassist for the rock band Fiction Plane, and co-founder of the company Vyclone, which made an app for recording video from multiple angles.

Personal life 

Joe Sumner is the son of the musician Sting and Northern Irish actress Frances Tomelty. He is the brother of Fuschia Katherine ("Kate") and half-brother of musician Eliot Sumner and actress Mickey Sumner, who are children of Sting and actress Trudie Styler.

He married Kate Finnerty on 4 December 2011.

He has three daughters and one son.

Career

Music
Sumner learned to play guitar and drums when he was a teenager, and was inspired to write songs when he heard Nirvana's album Nevermind. He formed a band with a school friend, bassist Dan Brown, which eventually became Fiction Plane when it was joined by British guitarist Seton Daunt.

Fiction Plane recorded its first album, Everything Will Never Be OK (2003), without a full-time drummer, relying instead on session musician Abe Laboriel Jr. Soon after, Fiction Plane hired drummer Pete Wilhoit, a native of Indiana.

After that album, Fiction Plane released Bitter Forces and Lame Race Horses (2005), Left Side of the Brain (2007), Paradiso (2009), Sparks (2010), and Mondo Lumina (2015). The band received much attention when it was the opening act for The Police's reunion tour in 2007.

In 2020 his song 'Hope' was performed by numerous vocalists as part of a get out the vote campaign for the Biden/Harris ticket.

Entrepreneur 
In 2010, the day after performing a concert, Sumner found videos of the show on YouTube that fans had filmed with their smartphones. Speculating that fans' clips could be linked into an interesting compilation, he co-founded the company Vyclone with David King Lassman to create a product of the same name.

The app united social media with individual video recording. Several people could film an event simultaneously with their smartphones, then upload their clips with Vyclone software, which assembles the clips into a movie shown from multiple angles. The app invited a variety of uses beyond filming concerts. The app was switched off in 2016.

He is the founder of NPSL soccer team City Of Angels FC.

References 

1976 births
Living people
21st-century English singers
English rock bass guitarists
Male bass guitarists
English rock singers
English male singer-songwriters
21st-century British guitarists
Joe
Sting (musician)
21st-century bass guitarists